Kanta is a Hungarian surname. Notable people with the surname include:

József Kanta (born 1984), Hungarian football player and coach
Szabolcs Kanta (born 1982), Hungarian football player

Hungarian-language surnames